Operation Valiant Guardian began in 2007 and was part of the Iraq War.

Background
Regimental Combat Team 2 and elements of the Iraqi Army's 7th Division completed Operation Harris Ba’sil after eight weeks of interdicting and disrupting enemy routes and safe havens outside of the major cities of the Euphrates River valley in western al Anbar province.

"We uncovered over 250 caches, arrested over 250 suspected insurgents and discovered over 100 improvised explosive devices,” said Lt. Col. Michael Manning, operations officer for RCT-2. "We clearly surprised them, the number of caches and detainees attest to that but more importantly, we let the enemy know that they can’t hide from us."

This marked the first large scale operation for RCT-2 this year, supporting Multi-National Force – Iraq's Operation Farhd al Qanoon and utilizing the surge battalions sent to the Anbar Province. RCT-2's operating area stretches from the Syrian border city of Al Qa’im down to the town of Hit, located northwest of Ramadi.

Units

United States Units
Regimental Combat Team 2

Iraqi Units
7th Division

References

External links
 Corps Press Release dated 15 April 2007; Story ID#: 2007415756

Military operations of the Iraq War involving the United States
Military operations of the Iraq War involving Iraq
Military operations of the Iraq War in 2007
United States Marine Corps in the Iraq War